"Blow Pony" is a popular queer event based in Portland, Oregon.

"Blow Pony Denver" was held in 2015.

Description
"Blow Pony" is a queer event organized by nightlife promoter Airick Redwolf, who saw LGBT establishments targeting either men or women and wanted to create an event series inclusive to the entire community. Redwolf said of the event's origin and purpose: Blow Pony was created as a place for people of all walks of life to gather in a respectful place, and to feel safer to express themselves, but also to showcase queer talent and queer artists. It's also a social, a dance, a good time. I moved to Portland from London, and the queer spots there are pretty much what you get with Blow Pony: low tolerance of bullshit and assholism, and a high tolerance of people expressing themselves and being themselves, respectfully. I enjoyed that. People were having fun and enjoying themselves and doing drugs and getting drunk, or not doing drugs or getting drunk—being sexual, enjoying music, whatever they felt that element was to bring them out of their box.

The recurring LGBTQ-based event is among Portland's most popular, drawing 800 people regularly, and sometimes as many as 2,000 people.

History

"Blow Pony" was established c. 2007 and originally held at the "old" Eagle gay bar on West Burnside Street. The event series was popular from the start, but had to relocate to the gay bar Casey's when the Eagle closed. Casey's hosted "Blow Pony" for less than a year due to conflicts with neighboring tenants and attacks on patrons. Bruce LaBruce was a guest disc jockey in 2008. From 2009 to 2016, the event was hosted at Euphoria Nightclub, a venue on Southeast 3rd Avenue with two levels: Rotture and Branx. The event hosted its eighth anniversary celebration in March 2015.

In June 2016, Euphoria changed ownership, and the new owner and his promotion company opted to target a single demographic and play only electronic dance music. The venue stopped hosting "Blow Pony" and its counterpart event "Bearracuda" immediately, despite event organizers having contractual agreements through November. "Blow Pony" started being held at Bossanova Ballroom, which also hosts the lesbian dance party "Inferno", on July 16, 2016.

Reception
The event, along with "Bearracuda" which is billed as "the largest bear party in the world", have been called mainstays of Portland's queer community.

References

External links

 
 

2007 establishments in Oregon
Events in Portland, Oregon
LGBT culture in Portland, Oregon
LGBT events in Oregon
Queer culture
Recurring events established in 2007